The 1979 East Carolina Pirates football team was an American football team that represented East Carolina University as an independent during the 1979 NCAA Division I-A football season. In their sixth season under head coach Pat Dye, the team compiled a 7–3–1 record.

Schedule

References

East Carolina
East Carolina Pirates football seasons
East Carolina Pirates football